"King" Carl Sorokoski (March 17, 1921 – June 7, 1977), was a Canadian ice hockey player with the Lethbridge Maple Leafs. He won a gold medal at the 1951 World Ice Hockey Championships in Paris, France. The 1951 Lethbridge Maple Leafs team was inducted to the Alberta Sports Hall of Fame in 1974.

References

1921 births
1977 deaths
Canadian ice hockey goaltenders
Sportspeople from Red Deer, Alberta
Ice hockey people from Alberta